The Key Peninsula is a peninsula located in Pierce County, Washington. It is approximately 16 miles (26 km) long and extends south from the Kitsap Peninsula. The area is home to multiple state parks, and many highly populated urban areas which influence the school districts of the area. Like other areas of Washington State, the Key Peninsula also has dynamic geographic regions which offer a number of opportunities on both water and land.

History

Early History 
The Key Peninsula was originally home Native American tribes, such as the Squaxin Island and Nisqually Tribes, who relied on the natural resources of the Puget Sound for their livelihood. Europeans first migrated into the peninsula in the 1830s, which at the time was referred to as Longbranch Peninsula. In the 1930s, due to the key-shape of the peninsula, it was officially renamed "Key Peninsula".

In the late 19th century, the Key Peninsula attracted more homesteaders and settlers. Pierce County Community Plans were created to construct roads and infrastructure to support the increasing development and commercial activity in the KP. Today, the Key Peninsula has evolved into a rural residential community, and is home to a mix of small towns, forests, and wildlife.

Population 
The population of the Key Peninsula was projected to grow from 11,016 in 1990 to 16,369 in 2022; however, this number was surpassed by the year 2015. Today, the total population in the Key Peninsula is about 20,000 people.

Geography

Urban & Rural Areas 
Urban areas of the Key Peninsula include the city of Gig Harbor, Purdy, Canterwood, Swede Hill, Donkey Creek Corridor, West Gig Harbor, and the Reid Drive Neighborhood. Rural areas of the Key Peninsula include East Gig Harbor, Crescent Valley, Rosedale, Ray Nash Valley, Artondale, Arletta, Cromwell and Warren, Fox Island, and Point Fosdick.

Hydrology 
The Key Peninsula extends into the Puget Sound, which is a large inlet of the Pacific Ocean. The Puget Sound is 95 miles long and borders the northwestern part of Washington State. It is a popular location for tourists and outdoor activities such as boating, kayaking, and fishing. Additionally, the Hood Canal is a saltwater fjord that is also located in the Puget Sound region.

Parks 
The Key Peninsula is home to two State Parks: Penrose Point State Park and Joemma Beach State Park. Penrose Point State Park is a 237-acre park, well-known for its camping and shellfishing culture. Joemma Beach State Park also features a marine camping park.

Schools 
The Key Peninsula is in the Peninsula School District; Elementary school is provided by a number of small schools up and down the peninsula while middle school is provided by Key Peninsula Middle School. High school students attend Peninsula High School (PHS) in Purdy or their rivals Gig Harbor High School (GHHS) in Gig Harbor.

Gallery

References

External links
Key Peninsula News

Peninsulas of Washington (state)
Landforms of Pierce County, Washington
Seattle metropolitan area
Landforms of Puget Sound